In modern Russian culture "British scientists" (Britanskiye uchyonyye) is a running joke used as an ironic reference to absurd news reports about scientific discoveries: "British scientists managed to establish that..." It has also become a Russian internet meme. A similar joke, "British research" exists in Chinese-speaking countries.

Description 
The crowdsourced Russian internet subculture encyclopedia Lurkmore defines the term as "a synonym for researchers working on pseudoscientific projects that are bonkers, idiotic and have absolutely no practical value".

James Harkin wrote: "When they hear the phrase 'British scientists', Russians don't tend to think of Newton, Darwin or Faraday; nor do they think of Stephen Hawking or Peter Higgs. Instead, they are much more likely to think of psychologist Richard Stephens of Keele University, who determined that swearing can help reduce pain, or Olli Loukola of Queen Mary University of London, who has taught bumblebees how to play football".

Typical news about "" [Britanskiye uchyonyye, "British scientists"] report that they:
 found out that people start lying as early as at 6 years old
 debunked the myth that mice love cheese
 invented non-stick bubble gum
 designed an ideal sandwich
 developed a universal vaccine
 etc.

History 
Lurkmore writes that the meme started proliferating somewhere in 2003–2004 and attributes its spreading to a Pleshner, a user of dirty.ru who had made multiple posts all over runet. However, Russian linguist  remarks that all discoveries of "British scientists" reported by Pleshner have already been published in Russian media earlier. During the peak of popularity of the meme there were several websites (british.powernet.ru, british-science.ru, etc.) dedicated to the revelations of "British scientists".

Krongauz writes that, as it goes with other internet memes, it is pointless to try to figure out why British, why not Japanese, nor American, not even English. The only thing is sure, he notes, that once the meme took off, it started to self-proliferate because journalists started putting slight spins on science news in its favor. For example, if there is a report about a British-American team, in the Russian version only British would be mentioned by nation, and of course, the title or the lede will most definitely say that British scientists did this or that. A similar opinion was expressed during a minipoll on what British scientists think about "British scientists" carried out in 2019 by the London-based Russophone Zima Magazine: popular media are routinely twisting the reports about scientific discoveries to make them clickbaity.

Internet statistics seems to corroborate the approximate date of the emergence of the meme: before 2014 the terms "" [English scientists] and "" [British scientists] appeared with about the same frequency, but since the second half of 2014 the British ones took the lead, with the gap ever increasing.

In 2015–2016 Russian popular science TV channel  [Наука 2.0] released a series of reports from England titled "British Scientists Have Proven..." [] about real research projects that look weird or funny. Capitalizing on the meme, the channel suggests that the term is in fact similar to the concept of "mad scientist".

British equivalent 
The British themselves have a similar concept referring to trivial, useless research, "University of the Bleedin' Obvious", coined in 2009 by two editors of The Independent, Steve Connor and Jeremy Lawrence, in a review of this kind of research. The "groundbreaking" reports they listed include:
 Images of bikini-clad women make men more sexist
 The more fit you are, the longer you will live
 Hurrying makes people less attentive
 Binge drinkers are more likely to fall over

See also 
 Golden Fleece Award
 Gulliver's Travels, the land of Laputa
 Ig Nobel Prize
 Junk science

References 

Russian humour
Running gags
Cultural depictions of scientists
Internet memes introduced in 2014